The Lesher Nomad is an innovative two-place homebuilt aircraft.

Design and development
Designer Edgar J Lesher had previously worked at Stinson Aircraft Company in Wayne, Michigan on the Stinson 106 Skycoach.  The Skycoach was a four-place aircraft with a pusher propeller, a configuration which captured Lesher's imagination.

In August 1958, he attended one of the early Experimental Aircraft Association Fly-Ins.  The homebuilt aircraft he saw there inspired him to design one himself.  Remembering the Skycoach, he began the design of an all-aluminum two-place, side-by-side, pusher propeller aircraft.  Construction began in February 1959.  In October 1961, after 5,000 hours of construction, he first flew his aircraft, the Lesher Nomad (N1066Z) at Willow Run Airport in Ypsilanti, Michigan.  A novel design feature was his use of a Dodge Flexidyne Coupling in the drive train to dampen torsional vibrations.  The aircraft was powered by a 100 hp Continental O-200 engine driving a 72-inch Hartzell ground-adjustable propeller.

Operational history
Lesher flew the Nomad to the 1962 EAA Fly-In in Rockford, Illinois, where the design attracted a lot of interest.  In 1964, flying Nomad, he took the grand prize in the AC Spark Plug Rally.  The aircraft was regularly flown until Lesher's death in 1998.

The aircraft is on display in the atrium of the Francois-Xavier Bagnoud building at the University of Michigan.

Specifications

See also 
Lesher Teal

References

External links 
 Picture of the Lesher Nomad aircraft

Homebuilt aircraft